Charles Augusta Thomas (October 3, 1931 – January 26, 2015) was an American sprinter and athletics coach. He was born in Fostoria, Texas, and died in Bryan, Texas.

References

1931 births
2015 deaths
American male sprinters
Athletes (track and field) at the 1955 Pan American Games
Pan American Games medalists in athletics (track and field)
Pan American Games gold medalists for the United States
Pan American Games silver medalists for the United States
Medalists at the 1955 Pan American Games